Fatih Kaya (born 13 November 1999) is a German professional footballer who plays as a forward for Belgian club Sint-Truiden.

Club career
Kaya began his youth career with TSV Klein-Linde and VfB Gießen, before later moving to the youth academy of Mainz 05. In 2016, he joined the youth team of FC Ingolstadt. In 2018, he began playing for Ingolstadt's reserve side.

Kaya made his professional debut for FC Ingolstadt in the 2. Bundesliga on 1 December 2018, starting in the match against Hamburger SV. He scored Ingolstadt's only goal of the match with a header in the 54th minute via an assist from Sonny Kittel. Kaya was substituted off in the 66th minute for Darío Lezcano, with the match finishing as a 1–2 home loss.

On 25 May 2022, Kaya signed with Belgian club Sint-Truiden.

International career
Kaya made his youth international debut for Germany's under-19 team on 25 April 2018, coming on as a half-time substitute in a friendly against Denmark.

References

External links
 
 

1999 births
Living people
Sportspeople from Giessen
German people of Turkish descent
Footballers from Hesse
German footballers
Association football forwards
Turkish footballers
Germany youth international footballers
FC Ingolstadt 04 II players
FC Ingolstadt 04 players
Sint-Truidense V.V. players
2. Bundesliga players
Regionalliga players
3. Liga players
Belgian Pro League players
German expatriate footballers
Expatriate footballers in Belgium
German expatriate sportspeople in Belgium